Maurice Hatton (22 May 1938 – 25 October 1997) was a British screenwriter and film director.

After training as a photographer, Hatton became involved in making documentary films, as a founder of Mithras Films in 1962, moving into making feature films several years later. 
  
Hatton was also on the BFI Production Board.

Hatton died in 1997 after a heart attack.

Selected filmography
Director
 Praise Marx and Pass the Ammunition (1970)
 Long Shot (1978)
 Nelly's Version (1983)
 American Roulette (1988)
 Satan at His Best (1995)

References

External links
 

1938 births
1997 deaths
British male screenwriters
British film directors
Mass media people from Manchester
20th-century British screenwriters